Philip Wasserman (December 1828 – February 26, 1895) was the mayor of Portland, Oregon, United States from 1871 to 1873. He was a pioneer banker and co-founder of the First National Bank.

Wasserman moved to Portland from San Francisco in 1858 and entered the tobacco and cigar business with his brother, Herman. He was part of a group of successful early Jews in Portland who exhibited a strong sense of public responsibility and appetite for public life, along with his predecessor (and Portland's first Jewish mayor), Bernard Goldsmith.

He died of heart failure at his home in Portland on February 26, 1895.

References

Mayors of Portland, Oregon
Jewish American people in Oregon politics
Jewish mayors of places in the United States
Jews and Judaism in Portland, Oregon
1828 births
1895 deaths
Oregon Republicans
19th-century American politicians